Steen Ottesen Brahe (28 August 1623 – 26 February 1677) was a Danish military officer and landowner.

Early life
Steen Brahe was born on 28 August 1623 at  Hagenskov Castle, the son of privy counsellor Jørgen Brahe (1585–1661) and Anne Gyldenstierne (1596–1677). He was the older brother of Preben Brahe (1627–1708).

In 1640, he enrolled at the university in Leiden, then continued to Strasbourg in 1645. After his return to Denmark, he succeeded his father at Knutstorp in Scania.

Career
In 1653, he was appointed  in the Scanian Company of the new national cavalry but he was fired in 1657. During the First and Second Dano-Swedish Wars, he returned to service.  He was in 1658 sent to Lolland with a small group of men and was present at the Siege of Nakskov.

During the Second Dano-Swedish War, in 1658–60, together with olger Vind, he served General War Commissioner and was thus responsible for payment of troops.

He was represented at the meeting of the estates of the realm in Copenhagen in 1660 and was one of the Sovereignty Act of 1661.

The Treaty of Copenhagen had ceded Scania to Sweden. Brahe still settled at Knutstorp but without swearing loyalty to the Swedish king. During the Scanian War, in 1676, he went back into Danish service with the rank of colonel and was put in charge of the new Scania Dragoon Regiment and participated with honor in the Assault on Karlshamns in October 1676. He was also responsible for organizing the border defence in Blekinge. He had in January that same year been appointed as county governor of Assens and Hindsgavl.

He died in combat on 26 February 1677 at Kristianstad.

Personal life
Brahe married Sophie Rosenkrantz, a daughter of Holger Rosenkrantz (1574–1642) and Sophie Brahe (1578–1646), on 6 September 1646.

References

Rxternal links

17th-century Danish landowners
Danish military officers
Brahe family
1623  births
1677 deaths